Greenwood Township is a township in Franklin County, Kansas, USA.  As of the 2000 census, its population was 429.  Greenwood Township contains the cemeteries of Central, Davidson, Greenwood, Hard Fish, and Keokuk.

Geography

The streams of Coal Creek, Kelsey Creek, Little Sac Branch and Whisky Creek run through this township.

History

Greenwood Township was organized in 1865 from a part of Ohio Township. The Sac and Fox agency was removed from the territory in 1863 to Quenemo, Osage County, and the first settlement in Greenwood occurred that year.

The town of Greenwood is located where the Sac and Fox Agency used to be. It was here where Keokuk and the other Sac nation members were relocated after the Black Hawk War.

When the Indians were removed it was determined to start a town. Judge G. B. Greenwood, of Arkansas, then United States Commissioner of Indian Affairs, assisted in making the treaty. The original settlers laid out the town and named it after Judge Greenwood. Two or three houses were built, but the town never prospered, but instead, passed rapidly out of existence.

The settlement of Greenwood is survived by the Greenwood Cemetery, Greenwood Community Church, and Greenwood Community Building.

Transportation
Greenwood Township contains one airport or landing strip, Chippewa Ranch Airport.

References
 USGS Geographic Names Information System (GNIS)
 Cutler's History of Kansas

External links
 US-Counties.com
 City-Data.com

Townships in Franklin County, Kansas
Townships in Kansas